Jaime José de Matos da Gama, GCC, GCIH, GCL (born 8 June 1947) is a Portuguese former politician. He was Minister of Foreign Affairs of Portugal from 1983 to 1985 and again from 1995 to 2002, and he was President of the Assembly of the Republic from 2005 to 2011. Since leaving politics, he has worked as Senior Strategic Counsel at the Albright Stonebridge Group, a global strategy and business advisory firm, and as Chairman of the bank Novo Banco dos Açores.

Background
Born at Senhora da Rosa, Fajã de Baixo, Ponta Delgada, São Miguel, Azores in 1947, he is a son of Jaime da Rosa Ferreira da Gama (Matriz, Horta, Faial, Azores, January 1914 – Lisbon, 29 July 2004) and wife Lucília Vaz do Rego de Matos (São Sebastião, Ponta Delgada, São Miguel, Azores, 12 September 1916 – Hospital Militar, Estrela, Lisbon, 21 September 1987).

Political life 
He graduated as a Licentiate in Philosophy from the Faculty of Letters of the University of Lisbon. He was involved in the opposition to the fascist Estado Novo (New State) regime, since his youth, and was first arrested, aged only 18, due to an article published in the local press. He was a member of the socialist CEUD in the campaign for the 1969 legislative elections, won by the National Union (the regime party), due to massive fraud. He was a journalist of the opposition newspaper República, in the last years of the fascist regime.

He was a founder of the Socialist Party, in the German exile of Bad-Munstereifel. He was elected for his party as a Deputy to the Assembly of the Republic for the Azores from 1975 and for Lisbon from 1983.

In the 1st Constitutional Government, he was Minister of Internal Affairs (1976–1978), and Minister of Foreign Affairs in the 9th Constitutional Government, from 1983 to 1985. He returned to the same ministry, in António Guterres' governments, from 1995 to 2002, and was also Minister of State and Minister of National Defence, in 1999, and Minister of State from 1999 to 2002.

He was President of the United Nations Security Council during June 1998. He was the chairman of the Presidency of the Council of Europe from 1 January 2002 until 6 April 2002, when he lost his post as Foreign Minister when the new government of José Manuel Durão Barroso took office in Portugal.

From 2005 to 2011, he was President of the Assembly of the Republic.

Foreign policy
As Minister of Foreign Affairs, Jaime Gama signed the Accession Treaty of Portugal to the European Communities, the Friendship, Cooperation and Consultation Treaty with Brazil, and initiated and concluded negotiations with China on the handover of Macau.
He negotiated and signed the New York Agreements between the UN, Indonesia, and Portugal that led to the self-determination and independence of East Timor. On several occasions, he managed crisis and peace and reconciliation efforts in Angola, Mozambique, and Guinea-Bissau. Jaime Gama was the Portuguese Minister of Foreign Affairs in 2002 when Angola reached peace after a 27-year civil war.

Jaime Gama proposed, negotiated and launched the Community of Portuguese Speaking Countries (CPLP).

As Foreign Minister he proposed and organized, with Algeria and Egypt, the first Africa-EU Summit, paving the way for the Africa-EU Partnership. As Speaker of the Parliament he negotiated and implemented the Parliamentary Forum of the Ibero-American Community of Nations.

Life after politics 

Jaime Gama is Senior Strategic Counsel at the Albright Stonebridge Group, a global strategy and business advisory firm led by former U.S. Secretary of State in the Clinton administration Madeleine Albright and former Commerce Secretary and Kellogg Company CEO Carlos Gutierrez.

Presently, he is a member of the General Council of the University of Lisbon, of the Supervisory Board and of the Strategy Board of the Political Studies Institute, both of the Lisbon Catholic University, of the European Council on Foreign Relations and of the Aspen Ministers Forum.

In addition, he is the Chairman of the Board of Directors of the bank Novo Banco dos Açores, Chairman of the Supervisory Board for the electronic newspaper “Observador" and a member of the Board of Directors of the Francisco Manuel dos Santos Foundation.

Honours
 Grand-Cross of the Order of Prince Henry, Portugal (19 April 1986)
 Grand-Cross of the Order of Christ, Portugal (2 June 1987)
 Grand-Cross with Star of the Order of Merit, Germany (9 May 1989) 
 Commander of the Legion of Honour, France (28 January 1991)
 Grand-Cross of the Order of Ouissam Alaouite, Morocco (6 February 1992)
 Medal of the Oriental Republic of Uruguay (12 August 1997)
 Commander's Cross with Star of the Order of Merit, Poland (22 September 1997)
 Grand-Cross of the Order of Civil Merit, Spain (17 June 1998)
 Grand Officer of the Legion of Honour, France (29 November 1999)
 Grand-Cross of the Order of Honour, Greece (17 March 2000)
 Grand Officer of the Order of Leopold I, Belgium (9 October 2000)
 Grand-Cross of the Order of Merit, Chile (30 September 2001)
 Grand-Cross of the Order of Merit, Italy (1 April 2002)
 First Class of the Order of the White Star, Estonia (29 March 2003)
 Grand-Cross of the Order of the Star of Jordan, Jordan (28 May 2009)
 Grand-Cross of Royal Norwegian Order of Merit, Norway (25 September 2009)
 Grand-Cross of Order of St. Gregory the Great, Holy See (3 September 2010)
 Grand-Cross of the Order of Liberty, Portugal (4 October 2014)

Family
He married in Lisbon on 18 September 1971 to Alda Taborda and their son, João Taborda da Gama, born in 1977, is a  Tax Law Professor of the Law School of the Catholic University of Portugal.
They have five grandchildren.

References

 Os Presidentes do Parlamento (Presidents of the Portuguese Parliament), Assembly of the Republic

|-

|-

|-

|-

1947 births
Living people
People from Ponta Delgada
Members of the Assembly of the Republic (Portugal)
Portuguese anti-fascists
Socialist Party (Portugal) politicians
Foreign ministers of Portugal
Presidents of the Assembly of the Republic (Portugal)
Grand Crosses of the Order of Christ (Portugal)
Grand Crosses of the Order of Prince Henry
Grand Crosses of the Order of Liberty
Commanders with Star of the Order of Merit of the Republic of Poland
Knights Grand Cross of the Order of Merit of the Italian Republic
Knights Grand Cross of the Order of St Gregory the Great
Grand Officiers of the Légion d'honneur
Recipients of the Order of the White Star, 1st Class
Grand Crosses of the Order of Honour (Greece)
Grand Cross of the Order of Civil Merit
Recipients of the Order of Timor-Leste
Grand Crosses 1st class of the Order of Merit of the Federal Republic of Germany